La Inmaculada Fort Historical Site is a nature reserve in Nicaragua. It is one of the 78 reserves which are officially under protection in the country.

Protected areas of Nicaragua